Miguel Gutiérrez Gutiérrez (7 May 1931 – 1 February 2016) was a Mexican footballer, who played forward for Mexico in the 1958 FIFA World Cup. He also played for Club Atlas.

References

External links
FIFA profile

1931 births
Mexico international footballers
Association football forwards
Atlas F.C. footballers
1958 FIFA World Cup players
2016 deaths
Footballers from Mexico City
Mexican footballers